Africallagma sinuatum is a species of damselfly in the family Coenagrionidae. It is found in the Democratic Republic of the Congo, Ethiopia, Malawi, South Africa, Tanzania, Zambia, and Zimbabwe. Its natural habitats are subtropical or tropical moist lowland forests, dry and moist savanna, subtropical or tropical dry and moist shrubland, rivers, lakes, marshes, and other wetlands.

References

Coenagrionidae
Odonata of Africa
Insects described in 1921
Taxonomy articles created by Polbot